{{safesubst:#invoke:RfD|||month = March
|day = 18
|year = 2023
|time = 06:37
|timestamp = 20230318063702

|content=
REDIRECT Three-Body (TV series)

}}